Ely Samuel Parker (1828 – August 31, 1895), born Hasanoanda (Tonawanda Seneca), later known as Donehogawa, was a U.S. Army officer, engineer, and tribal diplomat. He was bilingual, speaking both Seneca and English, and became friends with Lewis Henry Morgan, who became a student of the Iroquois in upstate New York. Parker earned an engineering degree in college and worked on the Erie Canal, among other projects. 

He was commissioned as a lieutenant colonel during the American Civil War, when he served as adjutant and secretary to General Ulysses S. Grant. He wrote the final draft of the Confederate surrender terms at Appomattox. Later in his career, Parker rose to the rank of brevet brigadier general. 

When General Grant was elected as US president, he appointed Parker as Commissioner of Indian Affairs, the first Native American to hold that post.

Early life and education
Ely Parker was born in 1828 as the sixth of seven children to Elizabeth and William Parker at Indian Falls, New York (then part of the Tonawanda Reservation). He was named Ha-sa-no-an-da and later baptized as Samuel Parker. Both of his parents were of prominent Seneca families; while his father was a miller by trade and a Baptist minister, he was also respected as a Tonawanda Seneca chief who had fought for the United States in the War of 1812. His mother was the granddaughter of Sos-he-o-wa, the successor of the great Haudenosaunee spiritual leader Handsome Lake.

His parents strongly supported education for all their children, whose Christian names were Spencer Houghton Cone, Nicholson Henry, Levi, Caroline (Carrie), Newton, and Solomon, all with the surname of  Parker. One of his elder brothers, Nicholson Parker, also became a prominent Seneca leader as he was a powerful orator, much like the family’s famous relation Red Jacket had been. Ely had a classical education at a missionary school, and was fully bilingual, speaking the Seneca language as well as English. He also studied in college. He spent his life bridging his identities as Seneca and a resident of the United States.

Beginning in the 1840s, when Ely was a teenager, the Parker home became a meeting place of non-Indian scholars who were interested in the Haudenosaunee, such as Lewis Henry Morgan, Henry Rowe Schoolcraft, and John Wesley Powell. They all played a role in the studies that formed ethnology and anthropology as an academic discipline.

As a young man, Parker worked in a legal firm reading law for the customary three years with an established firm in Ellicottville, New York before applying to take the bar examination. He was not permitted to take it because as a Seneca, he was not then considered a United States citizen. All American Indians were not considered citizens until passage of the Indian Citizenship Act of 1924, but by that time, some two thirds were American citizens due to other circumstances (military service, etc).

Parker encountered scholar Lewis Henry Morgan through a chance meeting in a bookstore. At the time Morgan was a young lawyer involved in forming “The Grand Order of the Iroquois”, a fraternity of young white men from Upstate New York who romanticized their image of the American Indian and wanted to model their group after “Iroquois“ ideals. The two bridged their cultures to become friends, and Parker invited Morgan to visit the Tonawanda reservation in New York state. Parker became Morgan's main source of information and an entrée to others in the Seneca and other Haudenosaunee nations. Morgan later dedicated his book League of the Iroquois (1851) to Parker, noting that "the materials are the fruit of our joint researches."

The relationship proved important for both men; as Parker helped Morgan become an anthropological pioneer, Morgan helped Parker make connections in the larger white-dominated society in which he later worked and lived. With Morgan's help, Parker gained admission to study engineering at Rensselaer Polytechnic Institute in Troy, New York. 

He worked as a civil engineer until the start of the American Civil War. Parker was later appointed by President Ulysses S. Grant to Commissioner of Indian Affairs, which Morgan had once had ambitions for.

Career
Parker began his career in public service by working as an interpreter and diplomat for the Seneca chiefs in their negotiations with the United States government about land and treaty rights. In 1852, he was made sachem of the Seneca and given the name Donehogawa, "Keeper of the Western Door of the Long House of the Iroquois".

As an engineer, Parker contributed to upgrades and maintenance of the Erie Canal, among other projects. As a supervisor of government projects in Galena, Illinois, he befriended Ulysses S. Grant, forming a strong and collegial relationship that was useful later.

Civil War service

Near the start of the Civil War, Parker tried to raise a regiment of Iroquois volunteers to fight for the Union, but was turned down by New York Governor Edwin D. Morgan. He tried to enlist in the Union Army as an engineer, but was told by Secretary of War Simon Cameron that, as an Indian, he could not join. Parker contacted his colleague and friend Ulysses S. Grant, whose forces suffered from a shortage of engineers. Parker was commissioned a captain in May 1863 and ordered to report to Brig. Gen. John Eugene Smith. Smith appointed Parker as the chief engineer of his 7th Division during the siege of Vicksburg, and later said Parker was a "good engineer".

When Ulysses S. Grant became commander of the Military Division of the Mississippi, Parker became his adjutant during the Chattanooga Campaign. He was subsequently transferred with Grant as the adjutant of the U.S. Army headquarters and served Grant through the Overland Campaign and the Siege of Petersburg. At Petersburg, Parker was appointed as the military secretary to Grant, with the rank of lieutenant colonel. He wrote much of Grant's correspondence.

Parker was present when Confederate general Robert E. Lee surrendered at Appomattox Courthouse in April 1865. He helped draft the surrender documents, which are in his handwriting. At the time of surrender, General Lee "stared at me for a moment," said Parker to more than one of his friends and relatives, "He extended his hand and said, 'I am glad to see one real American here.' I shook his hand and said, 'We are all Americans.'” Parker was brevetted brigadier general of United States Volunteers on April 9, 1865, and of United States Army March 2, 1867.

Post-Civil War
After the Civil War, Parker was commissioned as an officer in the 2nd United States Cavalry on July 1, 1866. He again became the military secretary to Grant, with the rank of colonel, as Grant completed his appointment as commanding general of the U.S. Army. Parker was a member of the Southern Treaty Commission, which renegotiated treaties with tribes who had sided with the Confederacy, were mostly from the Southeast, and now lived in Indian Territory.  On April 26, 1869, Parker resigned from the army with the rank of brevet brigadier general of the regular army.

He was elected a Veteran Companion of the New York Commandery of the Military Order of the Loyal Legion of the United States, a military society of officers of the Union armed forces and their descendants.

Personal life
After the war, in 1867 Parker married Minnie Orton Sackett (1849–1932). They had one daughter, Maud Theresa Parker (1878–1956).

Appointment under Grant
Shortly after Grant took office as president in March 1869, he appointed Parker as Commissioner of Indian Affairs. He was the first Native American to hold the office. Parker became the chief architect of President Grant's Peace Policy in relation to the Native Americans in the West. Under his leadership, the number of military actions against Indians were reduced, and there was an effort to support tribes in their transition to lives on reservations. In 1871, however, a disaffected former Commissioner of Indian Affairs named William Welsh accused Parker of corruption. Although Parker was cleared of any significant wrongdoing by the House Committee on Appropriations, his position was stripped of much of its power and he resigned in 1871.

Post Commissioner of Indian Affairs
After leaving government service, Parker invested in the stock market. At first he did well, but eventually he lost the fortune he had accumulated, after the Panic of 1873. 

Through his social connections, Parker received an appointment to the Board of Commissioners of the New York Police Department's Committee on Supplies and Repairs. Parker received many visits at Police Headquarters on Mulberry Street from Jacob Riis, the photographer famous for documenting the lives of slum dwellers.

Later life, death, and reinterment
Parker lived his last years in poverty, dying in Fairfield, Connecticut on August 31, 1895. He was buried, but the Seneca did not believe that this Algonquian territory was appropriate for his final resting place. They requested that his widow relocate his body. On January 20, 1897, his body was exhumed and reinterred at Forest Lawn Cemetery in Buffalo, New York. He was reinterred next to his ancestor Red Jacket, a famous Seneca orator, and other notables of Western New York.

Legacy
Ely S. Parker Building of the Bureau of Indian Affairs in Reston, Virginia
Parker's career and influence on contemporary Native Americans is described in Chapter 8 of Dee Brown's Bury My Heart at Wounded Knee.
He is said to have helped found the town of Parker, Arizona. Another individual with the surname of Parker is credited with this distinction as well. The Arizona Republic, dated April 29, 1871 indicates that the new post office was named after “Ely Parker”.
Parker is honored on the reverse of the 2022 Sacagawea dollar coin.

In popular culture
Jacob Riis featured Parker as a character in a short story, "A Dream of the Woods," about a Mohawk woman and her child stranded in Grand Central Terminal.
Asa-Luke Twocrow plays Ely Parker in the film Lincoln (2012), directed by Steven Spielberg.
Gregory Sierra plays him in Season 3, Episode 7 of the American TV series Dr. Quinn: Medicine Woman. 
Parker is featured as a character in the novels Grant Comes East and Never Call Retreat.
Parker is featured in season 2 of the podcast drama 1865.

See also

Fellows v. Blacksmith Parker acting as plaintiff for Blacksmith's estate before the United States Supreme Court
Arthur C. Parker, Nephew and biographer of Ely Parker

Notes

Further reading
 Armstrong, William H. Warrior in Two Camps. (Syracuse University Press, 1978) .
 Bruchac, Joseph. Walking Two Worlds.. (7th Generation, 2015) . Biography for young adults.
 Michaelsen, Scott. "Ely S. Parker and Amerindian Voices in Ethnography." American Literary History 8.4 (1996): 615–638. in JSTOR
 Moses, Daniel. The Promise of Progress: The Life and Work of Lewis Henry Morgan (University of Missouri Press, 2009) 
 Parker, Arthur Caswell. The Life of General Ely S. Parker (1919) online.
 Van Steenwyk, Elizabeth. Seneca Chief, Army General: A Story about Ely Parker (Millbrook Press, 2001) for high schools. online

External links

Biography, "Ely S. Parker", The Civil War, PBS
National Park Service: Ely Parker- A Real American"
Ely Parker Scrapbooks at Newberry Library
Ely Samuel Parker Papers at Newberry Library

Jacob Riis, "A Dream of the Woods"
Website for the PBS documentary A Warrior in Two Worlds (March 10, 2004)

1828 births
1895 deaths
American lawyers admitted to the practice of law by reading law
Burials at Forest Lawn Cemetery (Buffalo)
Grant administration personnel
19th-century Native American politicians
Native American United States military personnel
Native Americans in the American Civil War
People from Galena, Illinois
People from Genesee County, New York
People of New York (state) in the American Civil War
Rensselaer Polytechnic Institute alumni
Seneca people
Union Army officers
United States Army officers